Epaena is a genus of African moths of the family Thyrididae.

Species
Some species of this genus are:

Epaena andida (Whalley, 1971
Epaena candidatalis (Swinhoe, 1905)
Epaena complicatalis (Warren, 1897)
Epaena danista (Whalley, 1971)
Epaena inops (Gaede, 1917)	 
Epaena pellucida Whalley, 1971
Epaena trijuncta (Warren, 1898)
Epaena vocata (Whalley, 1971
Epaena xystica (Whalley, 1971

References
 Whalley, 1971. The Thyrididae (Lepidoptera) of Africa and its islands. Bull. Br. Mus. nat. Hist. (Ent.) Suppl. 17 : 1-198

External links
An Illustrated Guide to the Thyridid Moths of Borneo

Thyrididae
Ditrysia genera